Johan Valdemar Kemp (born Johan Valdemar Kemppainen; 1 July 1881 – 20 October 1941) was a Finnish gymnast who won bronze in the 1908 Summer Olympics.

Sport 
Kemp took part in two different sports in the Olympics.

White Guard 

He was a founding member of the Lahti White Guard and became its first local chief, and took part in the Mommila skirmish.

Sources

Literature

References 

1881 births
1941 deaths
Sportspeople from Helsinki
People from Uusimaa Province (Grand Duchy of Finland)
Finnish male artistic gymnasts
Athletes (track and field) at the 1908 Summer Olympics
Gymnasts at the 1908 Summer Olympics
Olympic gymnasts of Finland
Olympic bronze medalists for Finland
Olympic medalists in gymnastics
Medalists at the 1908 Summer Olympics
People of the Finnish Civil War (White side)
20th-century Finnish people